National nature reserves in Norfolk, England are established by Natural England and managed by it or by non-governmental organisations such as the Norfolk Wildlife Trust, the Royal Society for the Protection of Birds, and the National Trust.

List of reserves 
A list of national nature reserves in Norfolk:
Ant Broads & Marshes NNR (in The Broads National Park)
Blakeney NNR, including Blakeney Point
Brettenham Heath NNR
Bure Marshes NNR (in The Broads National Park)
Calthorpe Broad NNR (in The Broads National Park)
Dersingham Bog NNR 
Foxley Wood NNR
Heigham Holmes
Hickling Broad NNR (in The Broads National Park)
Holkham NNR
Holme Dunes NNR
Ludham - Potter Heigham NNR (in The Broads National Park)
Martham Broad NNR (in The Broads National Park)
Mid-Yare NNR (in The Broads National Park)
Redgrave and Lopham Fen
Roydon Common NNR
Scolt Head Island NNR
Swanton Novers NNR
The Wash NNR
Weeting Heath NNR
Winterton Dunes NNR

References 

 Norfolk
Nature reserves in Norfolk